NGC 77 (also known as PGC 1290, NPM1G -22.0006 or PGC 198147) is a lenticular galaxy located 780 million light-years away in the constellation of Cetus. It was discovered by Frank Muller in 1886. Its apparent magnitude is 14.8, and it is around 360,000 light-years across.

References

External links 
 

0077
1290
?
Cetus (constellation)
Lenticular galaxies